Train of Events is a 1949 British portmanteau film made by Ealing Studios and directed by Sidney Cole, Charles Crichton and Basil Dearden. It begins with a train that is heading for a crash into a stalled petrol tanker at a level crossing and then flashes back and tells four different stories about some of the passengers.

Plot
A Liverpool-bound train departs from Euston station in London in the period immediately after World War II. After dark, the train is travelling north at speed when a light being waved by the trackside is seen by the driver. He applies the brakes but a road tanker stalled across a level crossing is looming up just ahead. Plainly, there is not enough room to stop but, just as the collision is about to occur, there is a fade-out succeeded by a view of the locomotive sheds at Euston three days earlier.

Personal stories of passengers are then told in flashbacks which make up the "train of events" of the title. The first story, "The Actor", is about Philip (Peter Finch) who has a dark secret. He has been visited by his estranged wife and we learn that she has been unfaithful while he was in the Army. She jeers at him and he is roused to revenge, strangling her while a gramophone plays These Foolish Things. The theatre party to which he belongs is on the train, en route to Canada. Also on board is a costume hamper containing the body of his wife. He is hoping to get rid of it on the transatlantic crossing but detectives have been tracking him and are on the train.

The second story, "The Prisoner-of-War", is about Richard (Laurence Payne) and Ella (Joan Dowling). He is a prisoner of war (POW) on the run who doesn't wish to return to Germany. They have hitherto endured a miserable secret life in assorted seedy lodgings and Ella is hoping they can start again abroad. However, she has stolen money from her landlady to pay her fare and there is only enough for one of them to emigrate. Selflessly, she intends it be him.

The third story, "The Composer", is about composer Raymond Hillary (John Clements) who is travelling to a performance with his star pianist, the temperamental Irina (Irina Baronova). Although married he has had a string of dalliances, Irina being the latest.

The fourth story, "The Engine Driver", is centred on engine driver Jim Hardcastle (Jack Warner). He is facing his own crisis: he is a candidate for a management job at the locomotive sheds. Getting the job would take him off the footplate and allow him to work office hours, the heartfelt wish of his wife Emily (Gladys Henson). However, to cover for his daughter's future husband who was accidentally knocked out when Jim and his mate were trying to stop him resigning, then put into a fish wagon to come round which was hitched to a loco that ends up in Macclesfield, Jim covers for him by  working his shift and, if this were to come to light, it could cost him the promotion.

The film returns to the train, roaring through the night. Again we see the light by the track and the tanker just ahead but this time also the collision. The derailed and damaged train lies in ruins. Jim Hardcastle groggily recovers consciousness in a pile of coal from the overturned tender, as shocked passengers wander about. One of them is Richard but his Ella is badly injured and on a stretcher; she dies before she can be taken away and Richard runs from the scene (and the attending police) unaware of the steamship ticket in Ella's handbag, which blows away. Philip seems unhurt and makes a dash for freedom, but as he tries to evade the detectives he runs dangerously close to the wreckage and an unstable coach collapses upon him. Irina and Raymond are only bruised and their company is able to continue, albeit in bandages. There is a happy ending for driver Jim. The final scene shows him waving goodbye to his wife as he prepares to cycle across to the locomotive sheds on the first day of his new job.

Main cast
"The Engine Driver" (directed by Sidney Cole)
 Jack Warner as Jim Hardcastle
 Gladys Henson as Mrs Hardcastle
 Susan Shaw as Doris Hardcastle
 Patric Doonan as Ron Stacey
 Miles Malleson as Timekeeper
 Philip Dale as Hardcastle's fireman
 Leslie Phillips as Stacey's Fireman

"The Prisoner-of-War" (directed by Basil Dearden)
 Joan Dowling as Ella
 Laurence Payne as Richard
 Olga Lindo as Mrs Bailey

"The Composer" (directed by Charles Crichton)
 Valerie Hobson as Stella
 John Clements as Raymond Hillary
 Irina Baronova as Irina
 John Gregson as Malcolm
 Gwen Cherrell as Charmian
 Jacqueline Byrne as TV Announcer

"The Actor" (directed by Basil Dearden)
 Peter Finch as Philip
 Mary Morris as Louise
 Laurence Naismith as Joe Hunt
 Doris Yorke as Mrs Hunt
 Michael Hordern as Plainclothesman
 Charles Morgan as Plainclothesman
 Guy Verney as Producer
 Mark Dignam as Bolingbroke
 Philip Ashley as Actor
 Bryan Coleman as Actor
 Henry Hewitt as Actor
 Lyndon Brook as Actor

Production 
Jack Warner was permanently injured while making this film. He had insisted on learning how a steam engine is driven to get his posture right, but slipped on a patch of oil and fell into a locomotive turntable pit and injured his back. He had a slight limp ever afterwards as a result which remained with him and became noticeably worse as he aged until his death.

One quirk of the film is that one of the digits on the smokebox number plate of a locomotive featured in one of the early scenes is painted out (presumably to avoid worrying passengers who might fear that it really would be involved in an accident) but is still clearly readable because the numbers themselves were made from raised metal.

The locomotives used in the film included two LMS Class 3F "Jinty" 0-6-0Ts Nos. 47327 and 47675, and LMS Royal Scot Class No. 46126 Royal Army Service Corps. One of these engines 47327 survives to this day and is based on the Midland Railway in Butterley.

Reception
The film premiered on 18 August 1949 at the Gaumont Haymarket in London, and the reviewer for The Times didn't appreciate the four-in-one storyline : "The contrivance at best is clumsy, and there are not any inherent virtues in "Train of Events" to compensate for the inevitable distraction and division of attention."

References

External links
 
 

1949 films
British anthology films
1949 drama films
Films directed by Basil Dearden
Films directed by Charles Crichton
Rail transport films
British drama films
Ealing Studios films
Films set in London
Films with screenplays by Basil Dearden
British black-and-white films
1940s English-language films
1940s British films